Eleanor Irene Clift (née Roeloffs; born July 7, 1940)  is an American political journalist, television pundit, and author. She is a contributor to MSNBC and blogger for The Daily Beast. She is best known as a regular panelist on The McLaughlin Group. Clift is a board member at the IWMF (International Women's Media Foundation).

Early years
Eleanor Roeloffs was born in the New York City borough of Brooklyn, the daughter of German immigrants from the island of Föhr in the North Sea. She grew up in the Jackson Heights neighborhood of Queens, where her parents ran a delicatessen in Sunnyside. Clift was raised a Lutheran. She attended both Hofstra University and Hunter College, but left both schools without a degree.

Journalism career
Clift began her career in 1963 as a secretary at Newsweek, and was one of the first female reporters to earn an internship from the secretary pool. Working out of Atlanta, Clift became the reporter assigned to cover the then-unlikely candidate, Jimmy Carter. Clift travelled with the campaign and reported from the road. After Carter's win, Clift became White House correspondent for Newsweek and has covered every presidential campaign for the magazine since 1976. When Newsweek merged with The Daily Beast in 2010, Clift stayed on to cover politics for the online publication.

Broadcasting career
She began a broadcast career on The Diane Rehm Show on WAMU-FM, Washington, D.C., as a Friday week-in-review panelist.  She became known to listeners for her good-natured acceptance of ribbing from other panelists and callers to the program.

She became a regular panelist on the nationally syndicated show The McLaughlin Group, which she has compared to "a televised food fight".

Her role as a talk show panelist has led to appearances in movies. Clift played a panelist in Rising Sun (1993) and appeared as herself in Dave (1993), Independence Day (1996) and Getting Away with Murder (1996). She was portrayed by Jan Hooks on Saturday Night Live.  She was also portrayed by actress Mary Ann Burger in the 2009 film Watchmen.

In 2008, she wrote Two Weeks of Life: A Memoir of Love, Death, and Politics, which intertwines the events of her own life and those of the nation concerning the Terri Schiavo case during a two-week period in March 2005. In it she examines the way people in the United States deal with death, publicity and personality.

She was a keynote speaker at the 2012 Washington & Jefferson College Energy Summit, where the Washington & Jefferson College Energy Index was unveiled.

Contributing to the anthology Our American Story (2019), Clift addressed the possibility of a shared American narrative and focused on America as a social movement, writing, "[S]ocial movements are America's story, and they're my story as a woman born in the middle of the last century whose life was made measurably better amid these broad strokes of history."

Honors
Hoover Institution William and Barbara Edwards Media Fellow September 16–22, 2002

Personal life
Clift married William Brooks Clift Jr. (1919–1986), the older brother of actor Montgomery Clift, in 1964; they had three sons before divorcing in 1981. In 1989, Clift married Tom Brazaitis, a Washington columnist for The Plain Dealer in Cleveland, Ohio. They remained together until his death from kidney cancer in 2005.

Bibliography

 
 
 
 
 
 Eleanor Clift and Matthew Spieler (2012). Selecting a President. New York: Thomas Dunne Books.

References

Further reading 
 Clift, Eleanor, "The Magazine That Was: Eleanor Clift on Her 50 Years at Newsweek", Newsweek, September 27, 2013
 Clift, Eleanor, "The White House", newsweekmemories.org website

External links

Eleanor Clift official website

 

1940 births
Living people
American columnists
American women columnists
American political commentators
American political writers
American people of German descent
Television personalities from New York City
American women television personalities
Hoover Institution Edwards Media Fellows
Hunter College alumni
Newsweek people
People from Brooklyn
People from Jackson Heights, Queens